Sulh is an Arabic word meaning "resolution" or "fixing" generally, in problem solving. It is frequently used in the context of social problems. It is also an Arabic surname, mostly from Lebanon used in the variant Solh.

Usage
In Quranic Arabic, ṣulḥ is used as a term signifying an agreement or settlement over a property dispute and retains this sense in later Islamic legal usage. In Bedouin customary law, it can signify a settlement of a tribal feud and in modern Arabic usage, it is applied to treaties, such as ṣulḥ Versailles (the Treaty of Versailles). In general, it reflects a sense of resolution of conflict through negotiation. The two parties select respected individuals to mediate the conflict, a truce (hudna) is declared, a settlement is reached that maintains the honor and status of both parties, and a public ritual takes place. Particularly important is the fact that the practice affirms bonds between groups and not just individuals. It averts a cycle of revenge.

Ṣulḥ, in its sense of conflict mediation, has always been an important means of resolving disputes. In the Middle Ages, qadis could ratify an amicable settlement reached by litigants. It is still common in rural areas where governmental systems of justice have little force.

In Muslim political thought 

In the early days of the Islamic Empire, ṣulḥ, in the sense of "treaty" or "armistice," typically meant that a region had "surrendered on terms" or similarly during the Ottoman retreat it preceded a region's independence. Typically, it signified an area that was ruled and administered by its local political structure but acknowledged itself as a subject through the payment of tribute.

In the Muslim world view on divisions of the world the region called the Dār al-‘Ahd ("house of truce") or Dār aṣ-Ṣulḥ ("house of treaty") or Dār al-Hudna ("house of calm") was seen as an intermediate to Dār al-Islām ("house/abode of Islam"), or Dār as-Salām ("house/abode of Peace"), and Dār al-Ḥarb ("house of war").

Dār aṣ-Ṣulḥ, was then seen as non-Muslim territory that had concluded an armistice with Muslims, and had agreed to protect Muslims and their clients and interests within its borders. Often this implied a tributary situation, however modern writings also include friendly countries in Dār aṣ-Ṣulḥ. By no means was this particular division, however, recognized by all Muslim jurists, and due to historical changes these concepts have little significance today.

See also
Aman (Islam) or amān, assurance of security or clemency granted to enemies who seek protection
List of Islamic terms in Arabic
Tahdia, Arabic for "calming" or "quieting"; stands for calming down on hostilities but not a complete stop to them

Footnotes

References 
 Lewis, Bernard, The Political Language of Islam, University of Chicago Press, 1991,  The Political Language of Islam
Tillier, Mathieu (ed.). Arbitrage et conciliation dans l’Islam médiéval et moderne, in Revue des mondes musulmans et de la Méditerranée, 140 (2016).

Islamic concepts of religious geography
Islamic terminology